Christopher Ryan Lutz (born February 11, 1985) is a Filipino-American former professional basketball player. He last played for the San Miguel Beermen of the Philippine Basketball Association (PBA). Lutz grew up in Bedford, New Hampshire.

As a senior in Trinity High School in Manchester, New Hampshire, he averaged 20 points, 5 rebounds and 5 assists per game and was a 3-time member of the first team All-State Selection. To date, he is Trinity's all-time leading scorer with over 1,600 points.

After graduation from Trinity, Chris attended Brewster Academy in Wolfeboro, New Hampshire, as a postgraduate. At Brewster, Chris averaged 15.5 points per game and emerged as a top-level NCAA D1 recruit. He was an All-New England Prep School selection honoree. He signed a letter-of-intent with Purdue University in November 2004 after receiving interest from Columbia and Vanderbilt.

Playing the guard spot, Chris made it to the Big 10-All Freshmen Team in Purdue University. He then transferred and played for the Marshall University's Thundering Herd where he eventually became team captain.

He would later join the Philippine National Team, Smart Gilas and then
the 2011 PBA Draft where he became the 3rd Overall Pick.

PBA career

Chris filed his application for the 2011 PBA draft in July 2011.  And, on August 18, 2011, he was picked 3rd Overall by the Petron Blaze Boosters with whom he signed a 1-year contract in September of the same year.

His PBA debut on October 5, 2011 was quite impressive for a rookie. In the game versus B-Meg Llamados, which they won, Lutz chalked in 19 points, 6 rebounds, 3 assists, and 1 block.

The Meralco Bolts picked Lutz from the free agent pool and signed him in 2017. He is yet to play, though,  for his new team due to injuries.

PBA career statistics

Correct as of October 1, 2016

Season-by-season averages

|-
| align=left | 
| align=left | Petron
| 32 || 35.5 || .422 || .302 || .809 || 3.4 || 3.5 || 1.1 || .3 || 15.4
|-
| align=left | 
| align=left | Petron
| 43 || 26.1 || .395 || .326 || .783 || 3.1 || 3.5 || .6 || .1 || 8.4
|-
| align=left | 
| align=left | Petron / San Miguel
| 41 || 26.8 || .359 || .250 || .738 || 3.0 || 3.1 || .5 ||  .1 || 8.6
|-
| align=left | 
| align=left | San Miguel
| 54 || 26.2 || .405 || .275 || .817 || 2.8 || 2.4 || .7 || .1 || 7.6
|-
| align=left | 
| align=left | San Miguel
| 34 || 16.2 || .491 || .333 || .467 || 1.5 || 1.3 || .2 || .0 || 3.6
|- class=sortbottom
| align=center colspan=2| Career
| 204 || 26.1 || .405 || .288 || .776 || 2.8 || 2.8 || .6 || .1 || 8.5

References

External links
PBA: Chris Lutz's Stats
Chris Lutz Stats, Bio - ESPN
Chris Lutz, officially a Petron Blaze Booster
https://web.archive.org/web/20111217061435/http://www.mb.com.ph/articles/337030/pba-lutz-blaze-boosters
Chris Lutz - Marshall Thundering Herd - College Basketball - Rivals.com
Marcio Lassiter, Chris Lutz need Fiba OK | Inquirer Sports
Marcio Lassiter, Chris Lutz make us so good defensively–Toroman | Inquirer Sports
User Chris Lutz - Stack Overflow
Christopher Lutz Basketball Player Profile, stats, biography, career - ASIA-BASKET
Chris Lutz Minor League Statistics & History - Baseball-Reference.com
DraftExpress NBA Draft Prospect Profile: Chris Lutz, Stats, Comparisons, and Outlook
Chris Lutz, Marcio Lassiter cleared to play for Smart Gilas | LarongBuko.com
Married to the game: Petron Blaze's Chris Lutz
Philippine Basketball: PBA Player Profile: Chris Lutz
Player Bio: Chris Lutz
Chris Lutz MMA Stats, Pictures, News, Videos, Biography - Sherdog.com
Chris Lutz and Marcio Lassiter ruled ineligible | Smart Gilas Basketball
Chris Lutz - Smart Gilas
Chris Lutz Photos - Smart Gilas Pilipinas

1985 births
Living people
American sportspeople of Filipino descent
Basketball players at the 2010 Asian Games
Basketball players from Illinois
Basketball players from New Hampshire
Citizens of the Philippines through descent
Marshall Thundering Herd men's basketball players
People from Bedford, New Hampshire
Philippines men's national basketball team players
Filipino men's basketball players
Place of birth missing (living people)
Purdue Boilermakers men's basketball players
San Miguel Beermen players
Shooting guards
Small forwards
American men's basketball players
Asian Games competitors for the Philippines
Barako Bull Energy draft picks